Antonio Maria Nicolao Beduzzi (1675–1735) was an Austrian-Italian theater engineer, painter, and architect who flourished in Vienna at the turn of the 17th century.

He was born in Bologna in 1675. He succeeded Burnacini as the theatre architect at the Court in Vienna in 1708. Among his better known designs are:

 The interior of Melk Abbey for Jakob Prandtauer's baroque reconstruction
 Leopoldsberg church on Leopoldsberg above Klosterneuburg, near Vienna
 The cathedral museum of Passau
 Vienna's Theater am Kärntnertor (the site now occupied by Hotel Sacher)
 The frescos of the Landhaussaal in the Viennese Palais Niederösterreich

Beduzzi died in Vienna in 1735.

Gallery 

1675 births
1735 deaths
17th-century Italian architects
18th-century Italian architects
Architects from Vienna
17th-century Italian painters
Italian male painters
18th-century Italian painters
Architects from Bologna
Engineers from Vienna
17th-century Austrian painters
Austrian male painters
18th-century Austrian painters
18th-century Austrian male artists
Architects of Roman Catholic churches
Catholic painters
18th-century Italian male artists